Richelle is a feminine given name. Notable people with the name include:

 Richelle Bear Hat, Blackfoot and Cree artist
 Richelle Carey (born 1976), American broadcast journalist
 Richelle Cranston (born 1989), Australian rules footballer
 Richelle Mead (born 1976), American fantasy author
 Richelle Montoya, American politician
 Richelle Parham, American marketer; vice president and chief marketing officer for eBay
 Richelle Simpson (born 1982), Canadian artistic gymnast and acrobat
 Richelle Stephens (born 1996), American rugby sevens player

Feminine given names